Cash Cab may refer to:
Cash Cab (British game show)
Cash Cab (American game show)
Cash Cab (Canadian game show)
Cash Cab (Japanese game show)
Cash Cab (Australian game show)